Mohamed Al-Sada (born 7 February 1957) is a Bahraini sailor. He competed in the 1996 Summer Olympics.

References

1957 births
Living people
Sailors at the 1996 Summer Olympics – Laser
Bahraini male sailors (sport)
Olympic sailors of Bahrain